Sophie Mackintosh (born 1988) is a British novelist and short story writer. Her debut novel, The Water Cure, was nominated for the 2018 Man Booker Prize.

Biography 
Mackintosh was born in South Wales and grew up in Pembrokeshire. When she started writing, her initial focus was on poetry. She eventually gravitated towards prose fiction, which she has combined with holding various jobs during her 20s.

She is bilingual, and cites Welsh mythology and Angela Carter as influences. Mackintosh enjoys running and eating.

Her first novel The Water Cure was released in May 2018. According to The Guardian's review, the novel exposes the parts of real life that are usually not confronted in the world. British book editor Hermione Thompson who works for Penguin books and published the novel, wrote about the novel, “The Water Cure is an astonishing novel: it unfolds seductively, like a dream (or a nightmare), yet speaks urgently to the concerns of our own world. It heralds the arrival of a radical new voice in literary fiction.”

Her second novel, 'Blue Ticket' was published in September 2020. It is set in a future where women are only allowed to become mothers through a lottery of blue and white tickets. The Times called it "gripping, ethereal".

Her third novel, 'Cursed Bread' will be published in March 2023, and is set around the 1951 Pont-Saint-Esprit mass poisoning. According to The Telegraph, it is "shimmering fever-dream of a novel".

Bibliography

Novels 

 The Water Cure (2018), Hamish Hamilton
 Blue Ticket (2020), Hamish Hamilton
 Cursed Bread (2023), Hamish Hamilton

Short Stories 

The Last Rite of the Body (2019), Granta
New Dawn Fades (2018), We Were Strangers: Short Stories Inspired by Unknown Pleasures (Configo Publishing)
Revivalists (2018), The Stinging Fly
Self Improvement (2018), The White Review
Holiday with T (2017), Home is Elsewhere: The 2017 Berlin Writing Prize Anthology
What I Am Afraid Of (2017), Five Dials
Grace (2016), The White Review
The Running Ones (2016), Stylist
The Weak Spot (2016), Granta

Critical studies and reviews of Mackintosh's work

Awards 

 2018: Man Booker Prize, longlist (The Water Cure)
2017: Berlin Writing Prize, shortlist. (Holiday with T)
 2016: The White Review Short Story Prize, winner. (Grace)
2016: Virago / Stylist Short Story Prize, winner. (The Running Ones)

References

External links
 Grace - short story published in The White Review
 Self Improvement - short story published in The White Review
 The Running Ones - short story published in Stylist
 The Weak Spot - short story published in Granta

Living people
1988 births
20th-century Welsh people
20th-century Welsh women
21st-century British short story writers
21st-century Welsh novelists
21st-century Welsh women writers
21st-century Welsh writers
People from Pembrokeshire
Welsh women novelists
British women short story writers
Welsh short story writers